Hyalaethea is a genus of moths in the subfamily Arctiinae. The genus was erected by Arthur Gardiner Butler in 1887.

Species
 Hyalaethea alberti Rothschild, 1910
 Hyalaethea attemae De Vos, 2010
 Hyalaethea bivitreata Hampson, 1909
 Hyalaethea decipiens Rothschild, 1910
 Hyalaethea dohertyi Rothschild, 1910
 Hyalaethea malaitaensis Obraztsov, 1953
 Hyalaethea meeki Rothschild, 1910
 Hyalaethea solomonis Hampson
 Hyalaethea metaphaea Druce, 1898
 Hyalaethea obraztsovi De Vos, 2010
 Hyalaethea sublutea Bethune-Baker, 1908
 Hyalaethea woodfordi Butler, 1887

References

De Vos, R. (2010). "Two new species of Hyalaethea Butler from Indonesian New Guinea (Lepidoptera: Arctiidae, Syntominae)". SUGAPA (Suara Serangga Papua). 4 (3): 79–88.

External links

Arctiinae